Raihanul Haque is a Bangladesh Awami League politician and the former Member of Parliament of Rajshahi-5.

Early life 
Haque was born in January 1959 in Chandanshahr, Charghat Upazila, Rajshahi District.

Career 
Haque was elected to parliament from Rajshahi-5 as a Bangladesh Awami League candidate in a by-election in 2000 following the death of the incumbent Md. Alauddin.

References 

Awami League politicians
Living people
8th Jatiya Sangsad members
Year of birth missing (living people)